Saverio Imperato FRPSL (31 March 1935 - 20 November 2020) was an Italian immunologist and award-winning philatelist.

Early life and family
Saverio Imperato was born on 31 March 1935. He married Luisa.

Career
Imperato was an immunologist, microbiologist, and pathologist at the University of Genoa.

Philately
He was awarded six Grands Prix, 60 Large Gold medals and 19 Gold medals in competitive philately. He was president of the Grand Prix Club from 1989 to 1992. He was a fellow of the Royal Philatelic Society London.

Death
Imperato died on 20 November 2020.

Selected publications

References 

1935 births
2020 deaths
Italian immunologists
Italian philatelists
Philately of Italy
Academic staff of the University of Genoa
Fellows of the Royal Philatelic Society London